Sandra Elena Arana Arce (born 31 October 1973) is an American-born actress, model, and television presenter based in Peru.

Biography
Arana was born in Wisconsin, United States, but grew up in Lima. She studied at the Sacred Hearts Sophianum School. After graduating, she studied tourism and hospitality and became involved in acting. 

In 1999 she appeared in the telenovela Vidas prestadas, with Peruvian actor Bernie Paz and Venezuelan actress Grecia Colmenares.

In 2001 she became well-known from the Efraín Aguilar series , where she played Giannina Olazo.

She also participated in the telenovelas Eva del Edén and Ángel Rebelde from the production company .

In 2006 she appeared in seven different chapters for the Telemundo series Decisiones. In 2007 she returned to Peru to star in the miniseries Baila reggaetón, and then as an antagonist on Sabrosas. The following year she participated in El Rostro de Analía on Telemundo.

In June 2011 she began working as a reporter for the reality show Combate, which she won with the green team.

Filmography

Telenovelas
 Vidas prestadas (1999)
 Ángel Rebelde (2004) as Laura
 Eva del Edén (2004) as Josefa
  (2006) as Sor Andrea
 El Rostro de Analía (2008–2009) as Rogelia
  (2011) as Inés de Mayorga

Other fiction TV series
  (2001) as Giannina Olazo
 Habla barrio (2003) as Karina Aspíllaga
 Camino a casa (2006)
 Decisiones (2006)
 Baila Reggaetón (2007) as Cachita
 Sabrosas (2007) as Sherry Beltrán

Nonfiction TV series
  (2006)
  (2006)
 Pecaditos de la noche (2007), host
 Combate (2011–2012), reporter
  (2014–2016, Frecuencia Latina)
 Hola a Todos (2016, ATV), main commentator
 Bailando por el show (2017), participant

Theater
 Hormigas (2011)
 Travesuras Conyugales (2015)
 Papito piernas largas (2016)
 Por qué seremos así... (2017)

References

External links
 

1973 births
20th-century Peruvian actresses
21st-century Peruvian actresses
Actresses from Wisconsin
American expatriates in Peru
Living people
Peruvian female models
Peruvian film actresses
Peruvian stage actresses
Peruvian telenovela actresses
Peruvian television presenters
Peruvian women television presenters
21st-century American women